The Star Wars Roleplaying Game is a d20 System roleplaying game set in the Star Wars universe. The game was written by Bill Slavicsek, Andy Collins and J. D. Wiker and published by Wizards of the Coast in late 2000 and revised in 2002. In 2007, Wizards released the Saga Edition of the game, which made major changes in an effort to streamline the rules system.

The game covers three major eras coinciding with major events in the Star Wars universe, namely the Rise of the Empire, the Galactic Civil War, and the time of the New Jedi Order.

An earlier but unrelated Star Wars role-playing game was published by West End Games between 1987 and 1999. Bill Slavicsek was one of the designers of that former game as well.

This game from Wizards of the Coast is currently out of print. The current official Star Wars role-playing game is the game of same title published by Fantasy Flight Games.

Original and revised editions
The original Star Wars: The Roleplaying Game was originally published by West End Games as a d6 product, enjoying many years of play before WEG went bankrupt.

The d20 rebooted Star Wars Roleplaying Game originally came out around the time of the release of Star Wars Episode I: The Phantom Menace. It included statistics for many of the major characters of that movie. The later Revised game included material from Star Wars: Episode II – Attack of the Clones and changed various feats and classes.

The Star Wars Roleplaying Game uses a Vitality/Wound point system instead of standard hit points, dividing damage into superficial harm (Vitality) and serious injury (Wounds). A character gains Vitality points just like hit points in other d20 games, and rolls for them each level and adds their Constitution bonus. A character's Wound points are equal to their Constitution score.

Most game mechanics are familiar to players of Dungeons & Dragons and other d20-based games. Characters have six Ability Scores (i.e., the standard Strength, Dexterity, Constitution, Intelligence, Wisdom and Charisma), a class and level, feats, and skills. Most actions are resolved by rolling a twenty-sided die and adding a modifier; if the result equals or exceeds the difficulty, the check succeeds.

Species and classes
As with most d20 System games, Star Wars offers playable races (called species) and classes to the Player Characters (PCs).

The species of Star Wars d20 that are included with the Revised Core Rulebook are: Humans, Bothans, Cereans, Duros, Ewoks, Gungans, Ithorians, Kel Dor, Mon Calamari, Quarren, Rodians, Sullustans, Trandoshans, Twi'leks, Wookiees, and Zabrak and the unusual option for d20 games, Droid (this is unusual because it allows you to create your own race to an extent, and also you are ruled - technically mastered - by another player).

The character classes are Fringer, Noble, Scoundrel, Soldier, Force Adept, Jedi Guardian, Jedi Consular, Scout, and Tech Specialist (added with the Revised Edition). Prestige classes allow advanced characters who wish to specialize in certain suites of abilities to join a class devoted to them. For example, Jedi with special talents at helping others can choose to specialize as a Jedi Healer, while a blaster-wielding mercenary might earn a reputation as a Bounty Hunter. The core rulebook includes the Jedi Master, Jedi Ace, Crime lord, Elite Trooper, Starship Ace, Officer, Darkside Marauder, and Darkside Devotee. Supplements to the core rulebook introduce many more prestige classes.

Saga edition changed things around and made Force Adept a prestige class.

Original and revised editions releases
The following books are available for the original edition.

The following books are available for the revised edition.

Saga Edition

On June 5, 2007, Wizards released Star Wars: Roleplaying Game - Saga Edition Core Rulebook. The game was streamlined to be easier to play and a greater emphasis was placed on miniatures. Some of the major changes include:

Standard hit points have replaced the former Wounds/Vitality system. Each character begins first level with three times their maximum hit die in hit points based on their class which is modified by the character's Constitution bonus. Jedi and Soldiers for instance, have a hit die of d10, and begin 1st level with 30 hit points + Con bonus. Characters then roll a hit die for additional hit points as they progress in level. Characters also have a Condition Track which measures how much they are currently impaired. If Damage from a single attack exceeds the damage threshold, the PC is moved down the condition track. Each level of the track enforces progressively worse penalties until the PC is knocked out. Further damage can kill the character.
The number of character classes have been reduced to five — Jedi, Noble, Scoundrel, Scout and Soldier. Each class progresses along "character trees" similar to the d20 Modern system where characters are built with talents and feats. Jedi for instance, can follow talent paths such as Jedi Guardian, Jedi Consular, plus the new Jedi Sentinel and Lightsaber Combat talent trees. This allows for greater customization and more variety amongst characters of the same class. Prestige Classes are still available, but they each also have one or more talent trees.
Saving Throws have been changed to a series of "Defenses". Virtually all attacks and offensive powers now require a roll against one of three defenses — Reflex Defense, Fortitude Defense, or Will Defense. These Defenses are analogous to both Saving Throws and Armor Class (or Defense as in the previous system) in other d20 games.
Skill points have been eliminated. Characters have a number of "trained" skills they can pick based on their class and Intelligence bonus. When a character makes a skill check, they roll a d20 and add half their character level + any other bonuses. If they roll for a trained skill they get a +5 bonus to the die roll, and certain applications of some skills cannot be attempted unless trained in the skill. Skills themselves have been simplified and integrated, with such skills as Deception covering the former skills of Bluff, Disguise, and Forgery. The Mechanics skill now encompasses Repair, Disable Device, and Demolitions (as well as crafting devices in the expansion books). Likewise, the new Perception skill combines the Spot, Search, Sense Motive, and Listen skills.
Force sensitive characters now have a single "Use the Force" skill, which allows them to do a number of things such as moving small objects and searching their feelings. Force Powers are special abilities such as Force Choke or Move Object that form a "suite" of powers, similar to a hand of cards, which are used up, and recharge between encounters; all Force Powers involve a "Use the Force" skill check, and a greater margin of success on the check will produce a stronger effect. Force users can also select Talents related to the Force, and prestige classes grant Force Techniques and Force Secrets which further improve their ability to use the Force.
The game includes an optional Destiny system. Characters receive "Destiny Points" which are more powerful than Force Points. They allow such things as scoring an automatic critical hit without rolling, gaining 3 Force Points, or automatically succeeding at a virtually impossible task. Destiny Points are used to help characters with a predetermined fate (usually determined during character creation) eventually fulfill their specific overarching goal.
The character class Attack Bonus progressions no longer allow for multiple attacks during a full-round action. Instead, a character wielding a single weapon must pick the new "Double Attack" feat (for one extra attack) and "Triple Attack" feat (for two extra attacks), but both incurring significant attack roll penalties uniformly to all attacks that turn. Multiple attacks are, in general, less common, streamlining and speeding up combat turns.
Rules and stats for NPCs have been refined. There is only one non-heroic class for NPC characters. They do not get heroic Defense bonuses, their Hit Points are limited to 1d4 + Con bonus per level (and they do not receive triple maximum starting hit points at first level), they receive less ability score increases for every four levels they have, and they get only the feats granted by gaining levels; non-heroic characters do not gain Talents. Non-sentient creatures in the game use the "Beast" class and gain 1d8 + Con hit points per level.
Many minor bonuses have been eliminated. Alien races and classes now rarely grant bonuses to skill checks; instead they often allow a reroll of the check under particular circumstances.

Saga Releases 

The following books were released:

The Core Rulebook exists as an original and as a revised printing.

On January 28, 2010, Wizards of the Coast announced on their website that they would not be renewing their license to produce Star Wars products for their roleplaying and miniature gaming lines. Their license ended in May 2010.

Reception
Star Wars Roleplaying Game Saga Edition won the Gold ENnie Awards for Best Game, Best d20/OGL Product, and Best Rules, and the Silver award for Product of the Year.

Reviews
Pyramid
Pyramid - Saga Edition

References

External links

D20 System publications
ENnies winners
Role-playing games introduced in 2000
Star Wars role-playing games